No. 154 (Motor Industries) Squadron RAF was a Royal Air Force squadron formed as a fighter unit in the Second World War.

History

Formation and World War I
No. 154 Squadron Royal Air Force was formed on 7 August 1918, but was disbanded on 11 September having not received any aircraft.

Reformation in World War II

The squadron reformed in November 1941 at RAF Fowlmere as a fighter squadron equipped with Spitfire IIAs. It was briefly located in the south west of England then based at RAF Hornchurch. In November 1942 it moved to Gibraltar and Algeria to take part in Operation Torch. On  4 June 1943 it arrived in Malta, it then operated from Palestine and Cyprus.
From 23 August 1944 it was based at Fréjus, France, providing air cover for the forces that moved north to join those that had landed at Normandy. It was disbanded in Naples on 1 November 1944, but reformed on 16 November 1944 at RAF Biggin Hill to escort bombers and flew Mustangs until it was finally disbanded on 31 March 1945.

Aircraft operated

References

External links 

 History of No.'s 151–155 Squadrons at RAF Web
 154 Squadron history on the official RAF website
No. 154 Squadron film clip
No. 154 Squadron Spitfire at Alesani, Corsica in 1944 (photo by Quentin C. Kaiser)

154
Military units and formations established in 1918
1918 establishments in the United Kingdom
Military units and formations in Mandatory Palestine in World War II